M8C may refer to:
 The M8C spotting rifle, the spotting rifle affixed to the M40 recoilless rifle
 The M8C model of the McLaren M8A